General elections were held in Sweden on 15 September 1985. The Swedish Social Democratic Party remained the largest party in the Riksdag, winning 159 of the 349 seats. Its leader, Olof Palme, kept his position as Prime Minister. He would retain this position successfully until his assassination in 1986.

Campaign
At a campaign meeting in Sundsvall on 22 August, Minister of Social Welfare Sten Andersson promised to increase the state pensions as a compensation for the price increases following the devaluation of the krona in 1982. The Social Democrat (Socialdemokraterna) government also stressed that it had managed to decrease the budget deficit from 90 billion to 60 billion kronas. The Social Democrats also promised not to increase taxes or lower the quality of the welfare system.

The Centre Party had a technical cooperation with the Christian Democrats. The Christian Democrats always received fewer votes than the 4% threshold for gaining seats to the Riksdag. The cooperation was criticized within the Centre Party. The aim was for both parties to gain votes, but in the end the Centre Party's share of the votes decreased in comparison to the previous election in 1982. The Christian Democrats only gained one seat in parliament for its leader, Alf Svensson.

The political debate was dominated by the Moderate Party and the Social Democrats. In January 1985, the Moderate Party had proposed in parliament a detailed plan with tax cuts and cuts in spending. The Social Democrats' leader Olof Palme managed to turn this against the Moderate Party by repeating the negative effects this would have on junior soccer teams. The Moderate Party was supported by 30 percent in an opinion poll by SIFO in June 1985,  but its support decreased during the campaign.

The Liberal People's Party had chosen Bengt Westerberg as its party leader in October 1983; he had had trouble getting his message through, not least because of the party's small size in parliament and its only receiving 5.9 percent support in the 1982 election. However, in August Westerberg became viewed by the public as a calm and honest politician, in comparison to the constantly arguing Adelsohn and Palme. The Liberal People's Party was the big winner of the 1985 election, increasing its support to 14.2 percent.

Results

The Centre Party and Christian Democratic Unity (CDU) ran a joint list in some constituencies under the name "Centre". One CDU candidate was elected on the Centre list, the first time the party had had parliamentary representation.

Seat distribution

By municipality

References

General elections in Sweden
General
Sweden
Sweden